PP-208 Khanewal-VI is a Constituency of Provincial Assembly of Punjab.

General elections 2013
Rana Babar japani of PML-N won by 2150 votes

General elections 2008

See also
 PP-207 Khanewal-V
 PP-209 Khanewal-VII

References

External links
 Election commission Pakistan's official website
 Awazoday.com check result
 Official Website of Government of Punjab

Provincial constituencies of Punjab, Pakistan